David Gant (born 1943) is a Scottish actor and model.

Formerly a banker, Gant changed careers at age 30 to study dramatic art at the Royal Scottish Academy of Music and Drama in Glasgow, Scotland.  Graduating in 1974, he has found roles in theatre, film and television.

His credits include Coriolanus at Chichester Festival Theatre, and the films Victor/Victoria (1982), The Draughtsman's Contract (1982), The Scarlet Pimpernel (1982), Gandhi (1982), Brazil (1985), Chaplin (1992), Restoration (1995), Braveheart (1995), The Messenger: The Story of Joan of Arc (1999), Lagaan (2001) and Jonathan Creek: The Sinner and the Sandman (2014). He also voiced Oswald of Carim in the 2011 video game Dark Souls and Lord Aldia in the sequel, Dark Souls II, more specifically its special edition rerelease Scholar of the First Sin. Gant is an Associate and Licentiate of the London College of Music. Gant was the voice actor of Emperor Iedolas Aldercapt in Kingsglaive: Final Fantasy XV. For the Christmas 2016 period he plays the sheriff in the Theatre Royal Norwich production of Jack and the Beanstalk.

References

External links
 

1943 births
Living people
20th-century Scottish male actors
Scottish male models
21st-century Scottish male actors
Scottish male film actors
Scottish male stage actors
Scottish male television actors
Scottish male video game actors